Luis Tribaldos de Toledo (1558 in Tébar – 1636 in Madrid) was a Spanish humanist, geographer and historian.

People from the Province of Cuenca
1558 births
1636 deaths
Spanish humanists